"Show Out" is the first single from rapper Unk's second album, 2econd Season. It is produced by DJ Montay.

Music video
Cameo appearances are made by V.I.C., Soulja Boy Tell 'Em, Arab, JBar, Chilli of TLC and her son Tron. The video was shot at Movies ATL, a movie theater in Atlanta, Georgia.

Remixes
On November 26, an official remix was released. It features Unk, Soulja Boy Tell 'Em, Sean Kingston, Jim Jones and E-40. Jim Jones has appeared on the remixes to "Walk It Out" and "2 Step," the latter of which E-40 was also featured on. It is also available on DJ Envy's mixtape, "Codeine Overdose 2"

Charts

References

2008 singles
Unk songs
Song articles with missing songwriters
2007 songs
MNRK Music Group singles
Music videos directed by Dale Resteghini